Keefer–Brubaker Farm, also known as the Oscar Fogle Farm, is a historic home and farm complex located at Taneytown, Carroll County, Maryland. It consists of a two-story six-by-two-bay log-and-frame house which is partially encased in brick and rests on a rubble stone foundation  Also on the property is a frame summer kitchen, a combination smokehouse/dry house, a frame springhouse, a shop building, a bank barn, a dairy, a hog pen, a tool shed, poultry house, and several more recent buildings.  It is a representative example of a family farm complex which spans the period from the late 18th century to the mid 20th century.

It was listed on the National Register of Historic Places in 2006.

References

External links
, at Maryland Historical Trust

Farms on the National Register of Historic Places in Maryland
Houses in Carroll County, Maryland
Houses completed in 1820
Taneytown, Maryland
National Register of Historic Places in Carroll County, Maryland
1820 establishments in Maryland